"Per sempre" was the first single by Italian singer Marco Carta. It is part of Amici's compilation album Ti brucia and later included in his debut album Ti rincontrerò.

It was realised in Italy in March 2008 and has obtained a good success.

Chart performance

External links
 Official website

References

2008 debut singles
2008 songs
Song articles with missing songwriters